The 1984–85 Boston Celtics season was the 39th season of the Boston Celtics in the National Basketball Association (NBA). The Celtics entered the season as the defending NBA Champions, coming off an NBA Finals victory over the Los Angeles Lakers in seven games, and increasing their NBA Finals victories over the Lakers to 8.

On March 3, 1985, Kevin McHale surpassed Larry Bird's Celtics single game scoring record when he netted 56 points against the Detroit Pistons. Less than two weeks later, on March 12, Bird answered, scoring a career-high 60 points against the Atlanta Hawks.

In the playoffs, the Celtics defeated the Cleveland Cavaliers in the First Round in four games, the Detroit Pistons in the Semi-finals in six games, and the Philadelphia 76ers in the Conference Finals in five games to advance to the NBA Finals. In the Finals, they faced off against the Los Angeles Lakers, the team who they beat in last season's NBA Finals in seven games, and have beaten a total of 8 consecutive times in their NBA Finals matchups. However, the Celtics were defeated in six games by the Lakers, marking the first time the Celtics were defeated by the Lakers in the NBA Finals. This also marked the first time the Celtics lost the NBA Finals at home.

Trivia
A majority of this team moved onto coaching later in their careers. Kevin McHale, Rick Carlisle, Larry Bird, Danny Ainge, Dennis Johnson, and Sam Vincent have all coached in the NBA.

Draft picks

Roster

Regular season

Season standings

Record vs. opponents

Game log

|- align="center" bgcolor="#ccffcc"
| 1
| October 26, 1984
| @ Detroit
| W 130–123
|
|
|
| Pontiac Silverdome
| 1–0
|- align="center" bgcolor="#ccffcc"
| 2
| October 31, 1984
| New Jersey
| W 116–105
|
|
|
| Boston Garden
| 2–0

|- align="center" bgcolor="#ccffcc"
| 3
| November 2, 1984
| Detroit
| W 127–116
|
|
|
| Boston Garden
| 3–0
|- align="center" bgcolor="#ccffcc"
| 4
| November 7, 1984
| L.A. Clippers
| W 135–108
|
|
|
| Boston Garden
| 4–0
|- align="center" bgcolor="#ccffcc"
| 5
| November 9, 1984
| Philadelphia
| W 130–119
|
|
|
| Boston Garden
| 5–0
|- align="center" bgcolor="#ffcccc"
| 6
| November 10, 1984
| @ Washington
| L 95–112
|
|
|
| Capital Centre
| 5–1
|- align="center" bgcolor="#ccffcc"
| 7
| November 12, 1984
| @ Indiana
| W 132–115
|
|
|
| Market Square Arena
| 6–1
|- align="center" bgcolor="#ccffcc"
| 8
| November 14, 1984
| New York
| W 115–99
|
|
|
| Boston Garden
| 7–1
|- align="center" bgcolor="#ccffcc"
| 9
| November 15, 1984
| @ Chicago
| W 125–105
|
|
|
| Chicago Stadium
| 8–1
|- align="center" bgcolor="#ccffcc"
| 10
| November 21, 1984
| Golden State
| W 135–91
|
|
|
| Boston Garden
| 9–1
|- align="center" bgcolor="#ccffcc"
| 11
| November 23, 1984
| Washington
| W 118–110
|
|
|
| Boston Garden
| 10–1
|- align="center" bgcolor="#ccffcc"
| 12
| November 24, 1984
| @ Kansas City
| W 135–124
|
|
|
| Kemper Arena
| 11–1
|- align="center" bgcolor="#ccffcc"
| 13
| November 27, 1984
| @ Dallas
| W 114–99
|
|
|
| Reunion Arena
| 12–1
|- align="center" bgcolor="#ccffcc"
| 14
| November 28, 1984
| @ Houston
| W 110–100
|
|
|
| The Summit
| 13–1

|- align="center" bgcolor="#ccffcc"
| 15
| December 1, 1984
| @ Cleveland
| W 110–104
|
|
|
| Richfield Coliseum
| 14–1
|- align="center" bgcolor="#ccffcc"
| 16
| December 2, 1984
| Cleveland
| W 122–99
|
|
|
| Boston Garden
| 15–1
|- align="center" bgcolor="#ffcccc"
| 17
| December 4, 1984
| @ Detroit
| L 99–104
|
|
|
| Pontiac Silverdome
| 15–2
|- align="center" bgcolor="#ccffcc"
| 18
| December 5, 1984
| Denver
| W 123–107
|
|
|
| Boston Garden
| 16–2
|- align="center" bgcolor="#ccffcc"
| 19
| December 8, 1984
| @ New Jersey
| W 107–98
|
|
|
| Brendan Byrne Arena
| 17–2
|- align="center" bgcolor="#ccffcc"
| 20
| December 9, 1984
| Atlanta
| W 128–127
|
|
|
| Boston Garden
| 18–2
|- align="center" bgcolor="#ccffcc"
| 21
| December 11, 1984
| New Jersey
| W 116–105
|
|
|
| Hartford Civic Center
| 19–2
|- align="center" bgcolor="#ffcccc"
| 22
| December 12, 1984
| @ Philadelphia
| L 107–110
|
|
|
| The Spectrum
| 19–3
|- align="center" bgcolor="#ccffcc"
| 23
| December 14, 1984
| Utah
| W 117–106
|
|
|
| Boston Garden
| 20–3
|- align="center" bgcolor="#ccffcc"
| 24
| December 15, 1984
| @ Atlanta
| W 101–94
|
|
|
| The Omni
| 21–3
|- align="center" bgcolor="#ccffcc"
| 25
| December 18, 1984
| @ New York
| W 126–108
|
|
|
| Madison Square Garden
| 22–3
|- align="center" bgcolor="#ffcccc"
| 26
| December 19, 1984
| Milwaukee
| L 92–107
|
|
|
| Boston Garden
| 22–4
|- align="center" bgcolor="#ccffcc"
| 27
| December 21, 1984
| Indiana
| W 117–107
|
|
|
| Boston Garden
| 23–4
|- align="center" bgcolor="#ffcccc"
| 28
| December 22, 1984
| @ Chicago
| L 85–110
|
|
|
| Chicago Stadium
| 23–5
|- align="center" bgcolor="#ccffcc"
| 29
| December 26, 1984
| @ Phoenix
| W 119–114
|
|
|
| Arizona Veterans Memorial Coliseum
| 24–5
|- align="center" bgcolor="#ccffcc"
| 30
| December 27, 1984
| @ L.A. Clippers
| W 118–103
|
|
|
| Los Angeles Memorial Sports Arena
| 25–5
|- align="center" bgcolor="#ccffcc"
| 31
| December 29, 1984
| @ San Antonio
| W 120–112
|
|
|
| HemisFair Arena
| 26–5
|- align="center" bgcolor="#ffcccc"
| 32
| December 30, 1984
| @ Milwaukee
| L 98–114
|
|
|
| MECCA Arena
| 26–6

|- align="center" bgcolor="#ccffcc"
| 33
| January 2, 1985
| @ New Jersey
| W 110–95
|
|
|
| Brendan Byrne Arena
| 27–6
|- align="center" bgcolor="#ccffcc"
| 34
| January 4, 1985
| New York
| W 105–94
|
|
|
| Boston Garden
| 28–6
|- align="center" bgcolor="#ccffcc"
| 35
| January 7, 1985
| @ New York
| W 108–97
|
|
|
| Madison Square Garden
| 29–6
|- align="center" bgcolor="#ccffcc"
| 36
| January 9, 1985
| Chicago
| W 111–108
|
|
|
| Boston Garden
| 30–6
|- align="center" bgcolor="#ccffcc"
| 37
| January 11, 1985
| Washington
| W 103–101
|
|
|
| Boston Garden
| 31–6
|- align="center" bgcolor="#ccffcc"
| 38
| January 12, 1985
| @ Atlanta
| W 119–111
|
|
|
| The Omni
| 32–6
|- align="center" bgcolor="#ccffcc"
| 39
| January 16, 19858:00p.m. EST
| L.A. Lakers
| W 104–102
| Johnson (20)
| Parish (13)
| Ainge, Bird, Johnson (7)
| Boston Garden14,890
| 33–6
|- align="center" bgcolor="#ffcccc"
| 40
| January 18, 1985
| @ Indiana
| L 86–91
|
|
|
| Market Square Arena
| 33–7
|- align="center" bgcolor="#ccffcc"
| 41
| January 20, 1985
| Philadelphia
| W 113–97
|
|
|
| Boston Garden
| 34–7
|- align="center" bgcolor="#ffcccc"
| 42
| January 23, 1985
| Seattle
| L 97–107
|
|
|
| Boston Garden
| 34–8
|- align="center" bgcolor="#ccffcc"
| 43
| January 25, 1985
| Indiana
| W 125–94
|
|
|
| Boston Garden
| 35–8
|- align="center" bgcolor="#ccffcc"
| 44
| January 27, 1985
| Portland
| W 128–127
|
|
|
| Boston Garden
| 36–8
|- align="center" bgcolor="#ccffcc"
| 45
| January 29, 1985
| Detroit
| W 131–130
|
|
|
| Hartford Civic Center
| 37–8
|- align="center" bgcolor="#ffcccc"
| 46
| January 30, 1985
| @ Philadelphia
| L 104–122
|
|
|
| The Spectrum
| 37–9

|- align="center" bgcolor="#ccffcc"
| 47
| February 1, 1985
| Kansas City
| W 142–123
|
|
|
| Boston Garden
| 38–9
|- align="center" bgcolor="#ccffcc"
| 48
| February 2, 1985
| @ Washington
| W 97–91
|
|
|
| Capital Centre
| 39–9
|- align="center" bgcolor="#ccffcc"
| 49
| February 5, 1985
| @ Chicago
| W 110–106
|
|
|
| Chicago Stadium
| 40–9
|- align="center" bgcolor="#ccffcc"
| 50
| February 6, 1985
| Cleveland
| W 113–108
|
|
|
| Boston Garden
| 41–9
|- align="center"
|colspan="9" bgcolor="#bbcaff"|All-Star Break
|- style="background:#cfc;"
|- bgcolor="#bbffbb"
|- align="center" bgcolor="#ffcccc"
| 51
| February 12, 1985
| @ Portland
| L 103–111
|
|
|
| Memorial Coliseum
| 41–10
|- align="center" bgcolor="#ccffcc"
| 52
| February 14, 1985
| @ Seattle
| W 110–94
|
|
|
| Kingdome
| 42–10
|- align="center" bgcolor="#ccffcc"
| 53
| February 15, 1985
| @ Golden State
| W 107–100
|
|
|
| Oakland-Alameda County Coliseum Arena
| 43–10
|- align="center" bgcolor="#ffcccc"
| 54
| February 17, 19853:30p.m. EST
| @ L.A. Lakers
| L 111–117
| Bird (33)
| Bird (15)
| Ainge, Johnson (10)
| The Forum17,505
| 43–11
|- align="center" bgcolor="#ccffcc"
| 55
| February 18, 1985
| @ Utah
| W 110–94
|
|
|
| Salt Palace Acord Arena
| 44–11
|- align="center" bgcolor="#ffcccc"
| 56
| February 20, 1985
| @ Denver
| L 129–132
|
|
|
| McNichols Sports Arena
| 44–12
|- align="center" bgcolor="#ccffcc"
| 57
| February 22, 1985
| Chicago
| W 115–105
|
|
|
| Hartford Civic Center
| 45–12
|- align="center" bgcolor="#ccffcc"
| 58
| February 24, 1985
| @ Indiana
| W 113–100
|
|
|
| Market Square Arena
| 46–12
|- align="center" bgcolor="#ccffcc"
| 59
| February 27, 1985
| San Antonio
| W 111–102
|
|
|
| Boston Garden
| 47–12

|- align="center" bgcolor="#ffcccc"
| 60
| March 1, 1985
| Atlanta
| L 105–114
|
|
|
| Boston Garden
| 47–13
|- align="center" bgcolor="#ccffcc"
| 61
| March 3, 1985
| Detroit
| W 138–129
|
|
|
| Boston Garden
| 48–13
|- align="center" bgcolor="#ccffcc"
| 62
| March 5, 1985
| @ New York
| W 110–102
|
|
|
| Madison Square Garden
| 49–13
|- align="center" bgcolor="#ffcccc"
| 63
| March 6, 1985
| Chicago
| L 104–107
|
|
|
| Boston Garden
| 49–14
|- align="center" bgcolor="#ccffcc"
| 64
| March 8, 1985
| Dallas
| W 133–122
|
|
|
| Boston Garden
| 50–14
|- align="center" bgcolor="#ccffcc"
| 65
| March 12, 1985
| @ Atlanta
| W 126–115
|
|
|
| Lakefront Arena
| 51–14
|- align="center" bgcolor="#ccffcc"
| 66
| March 13, 1985
| Phoenix
| W 123–106
|
|
|
| Boston Garden
| 52–14
|- align="center" bgcolor="#ccffcc"
| 67
| March 15, 1985
| @ Cleveland
| W 119–96
|
|
|
| Richfield Coliseum
| 53–14
|- align="center" bgcolor="#ccffcc"
| 68
| March 17, 1985
| Houston
| W 134–120
|
|
|
| Boston Garden
| 54–14
|- align="center" bgcolor="#ccffcc"
| 69
| March 20, 1985
| Milwaukee
| W 107–105
|
|
|
| Boston Garden
| 53–14
|- align="center" bgcolor="#ccffcc"
| 70
| March 22, 1985
| Cleveland
| W 129–117
|
|
|
| Boston Garden
| 56–14
|- align="center" bgcolor="#ccffcc"
| 71
| March 23, 1985
| @ Washington
| W 104–98
|
|
|
| Capital Centre
| 57–14
|- align="center" bgcolor="#ccffcc"
| 72
| March 27, 1985
| @ New Jersey
| W 105–95
|
|
|
| Brendan Byrne Arena
| 58–14
|- align="center" bgcolor="#ccffcc"
| 73
| March 29, 1985
| Philadelphia
| W 112–108
|
|
|
| Boston Garden
| 59–14
|- align="center" bgcolor="#ffcccc"
| 74
| March 31, 1985
| @ Detroit
| L 105–113
|
|
|
| Joe Louis Arena
| 59–15

|- align="center" bgcolor="#ffcccc"
| 75
| April 2, 1985
| @ Milwaukee
| L 103–109
|
|
|
| MECCA Arena
| 59–16
|- align="center" bgcolor="#ccffcc"
| 76
| April 3, 1985
| Indiana
| W 119–103
|
|
|
| Boston Garden
| 60–16
|- align="center" bgcolor="#ccffcc"
| 77
| April 5, 1985
| Washington
| W 115–104
|
|
|
| Boston Garden
| 61–16
|- align="center" bgcolor="#ccffcc"
| 78
| April 7, 1985
| New York
| W 114–102
|
|
|
| Boston Garden
| 62–16
|- align="center" bgcolor="#ffcccc"
| 79
| April 9, 1985
| @ Philadelphia
| L 104–113
|
|
|
| The Spectrum
| 62–17
|- align="center" bgcolor="#ccffcc"
| 80
| April 11, 1985
| @ Cleveland
| W 121–115
|
|
|
| Richfield Coliseum
| 63–17
|- align="center" bgcolor="#ffcccc"
| 81
| April 12, 1985
| Milwaukee
| L 113–115 (OT)
|
|
|
| Boston Garden
| 63–18
|- align="center" bgcolor="#ffcccc"
| 82
| April 14, 1985
| New Jersey
| L 118–129
|
|
|
| Boston Garden
| 63–19

Playoffs

|- align="center" bgcolor="#ccffcc"
| 1
| April 18
| Cleveland
| W 126–123
| Larry Bird (40)
| Kevin McHale (12)
| Dennis Johnson (11)
| Boston Garden14,890
| 1–0
|- align="center" bgcolor="#ccffcc"
| 2
| April 20
| Cleveland
| W 108–106
| Larry Bird (30)
| Bird, Parish (11)
| Larry Bird (7)
| Boston Garden14,890
| 2–0
|- align="center" bgcolor="#ffcccc"
| 3
| April 23
| @ Cleveland
| L 98–105
| Scott Wedman (30)
| Kevin McHale (11)
| Dennis Johnson (10)
| Richfield Coliseum20,900
| 2–1
|- align="center" bgcolor="#ccffcc"
| 4
| April 25
| @ Cleveland
| W 117–115
| Larry Bird (34)
| Larry Bird (14)
| Larry Bird (7)
| Richfield Coliseum20,900
| 3–1
|-

|- align="center" bgcolor="#ccffcc"
| 1
| April 28
| Detroit
| W 133–99
| Robert Parish (27)
| Robert Parish (16)
| Ainge, Williams (7)
| Boston Garden14,890
| 1–0
|- align="center" bgcolor="#ccffcc"
| 2
| April 30
| Detroit
| W 121–114
| Larry Bird (42)
| McHale, Bird (10)
| Dennis Johnson (7)
| Boston Garden14,890
| 2–0
|- align="center" bgcolor="#ffcccc"
| 3
| May 2
| @ Detroit
| L 117–125
| Dennis Johnson (27)
| Larry Bird (13)
| Larry Bird (8)
| Joe Louis Arena14,209
| 2–1
|- align="center" bgcolor="#ffcccc"
| 4
| May 5
| @ Detroit
| L 99–102
| Kevin McHale (24)
| Kevin McHale (10)
| Larry Bird (7)
| Joe Louis Arena14,350
| 2–2
|- align="center" bgcolor="#ccffcc"
| 5
| May 8
| Detroit
| W 130–123
| Larry Bird (43)
| Larry Bird (13)
| Johnson, Ainge (6)
| Boston Garden14,890
| 3–2
|- align="center" bgcolor="#ccffcc"
| 6
| May 10
| @ Detroit
| W 123–113
| Dennis Johnson (22)
| Robert Parish (13)
| Danny Ainge (9)
| Joe Louis Arena21,193
| 4–2
|-

|- align="center" bgcolor="#ccffcc"
| 1
| May 12
| Philadelphia
| W 108–93
| Kevin McHale (28)
| Robert Parish (13)
| Dennis Johnson (8)
| Boston Garden14,890
| 1–0
|- align="center" bgcolor="#ccffcc"
| 2
| May 14
| Philadelphia
| W 106–98
| Larry Bird (24)
| Robert Parish (16)
| Bird, Johnson (7)
| Boston Garden14,890
| 2–0
|- align="center" bgcolor="#ccffcc"
| 3
| May 18
| @ Philadelphia
| W 105–94
| Larry Bird (26)
| Robert Parish (14)
| Danny Ainge (7)
| Spectrum17,921
| 3–0
|- align="center" bgcolor="#ffcccc"
| 4
| May 19
| @ Philadelphia
| L 104–115
| Kevin McHale (25)
| Kevin McHale (17)
| Danny Ainge (8)
| Spectrum17,921
| 3–1
|- align="center" bgcolor="#ccffcc"
| 5
| May 22
| Philadelphia
| W 102–100
| Dennis Johnson (23)
| Kevin McHale (14)
| Dennis Johnson (8)
| Boston Garden14,890
| 4–1
|-

|- align="center" bgcolor="#ccffcc"
| 1
| May 27, 19853:00p.m. EDT
| L.A. Lakers
| W 148–114
| McHale, Wedman (26)
| McHale (9)
| Johnson (10)
| Boston Garden14,890
| 1–0
|- align="center" bgcolor="#ffcccc"
| 2
| May 30, 19859:00p.m. EDT
| L.A. Lakers
| L 102–109
| Bird (30)
| Bird (12)
| Johnson (8)
| Boston Garden14,890
| 1–1
|- align="center" bgcolor="#ffcccc"
| 3
| June 2, 19853:30p.m. EDT
| @ L.A. Lakers
| L 111–136
| McHale (31)
| McHale (10)
| Ainge (10)
| The Forum17,505
| 1–2
|- align="center" bgcolor="#ccffcc"
| 4
| June 5, 19859:00p.m. EDT
| @ L.A. Lakers
| W 107–105
| McHale (28)
| McHale (12)
| Johnson (12)
| The Forum17,505
| 2–2
|- align="center" bgcolor="#ffcccc"
| 5
| June 7, 19859:00p.m. EDT
| @ L.A. Lakers
| L 111–120
| Parish (26)
| McHale (10)
| Johnson (17)
| The Forum17,505
| 2–3
|- align="center" bgcolor="#ffcccc"
| 6
| June 9, 19851:00p.m. EDT
| L.A. Lakers
| L 100–111
| McHale (32)
| McHale (16)
| Ainge (11)
| Boston Garden14,890
| 2–4
|-

Player statistics

Regular season
* – Recorded statistics when playing for Boston

|
| 80|| 77|| 39.5 || .522|| .427||.882|| 10.5|| 6.6 || 1.6 || 1.2|| 28.7
|-
|
| 80|| 77|| 37.2 || .462|| .269|| .853||4.0|| 6.8|| 1.2|| .5|| 15.7
|-
|
| 79|| 78|| 36.1 || .524||.000|| .743||  10.6|| 1.6 || .7 || 1.3|| 17.6
|-
|
| 75|| 73|| 34.2 || .529|| .268|| .868|| 3.6|| 5.3 || 1.6 || .1|| 12.9
|-
|
| 79|| 31|| 33.6 || .570|| 1.000|| .760|| 9.0|| 1.8 || .4 || 1.5|| 19.8
|-
|
| 57|| 51|| 26.2 || .533|| .000|| .831|| 4.2|| 1.8 || .6 || .3|| 11.1
|-
|
| 23|| 5|| 20.0 || .385|| .261|| .674|| 2.5|| 3.9 || 1.3 || .2|| 6.4
|-
|
| 78|| 5|| 14.4 ||.478|| .500|| .764|| 2.0|| 1.2 || .3 || .1|| 6.4
|-
|
| 75|| 6|| 11.4 || .383|| .000|| .640|| 1.2|| 2.0 || .8 || .0|| 2.4
|-
|
| 62|| 3|| 9.1 || .421|| .000|| .774|| 1.1|| .8 || .6 || .0|| 2.7
|-
|
| 47|| 0|| 8.4 || .416|| .391||1.000|| .9|| .5 || .4 || .1|| 3.2
|-
|
| 55|| 4|| 7.7 || .375|| .000|| .688|| 1.6|| .3 || .1 || .2|| 1.6
|-
|
| 38|| 0|| 4.7 || 388|| .000|| .882|| .6|| .7 || .1 || .0|| 1.8
|}

Awards and records
 Larry Bird, NBA Most Valuable Player Award
 Kevin McHale, NBA Sixth Man of the Year Award
 Larry Bird, All-NBA First Team
 Dennis Johnson, NBA All-Defensive Second Team

Transactions

See also
 1984–85 NBA season

References

Boston Celtics seasons
Eastern Conference (NBA) championship seasons
Boston Celtics
Boston Celtics
Boston Celtics
Celtics
Celtics